John H. Dasburg (born 1943 in Queens, New York), grew up in Miami, Florida and graduated from Miami High School. He served in the United States Navy during the Vietnam War.  He attended the University of Florida for college, and used the GI Bill to get his MBA also from UF.  He was one of the youngest name partners at Peat, Marwick Mitchell accounting firm, and went on to become one of the senior members of the executive team at Marriott.  He later accepted a position with Northwest Airlines, and became the CEO in 1990. He is credited with saving the airline from bankruptcy in the early 1990s. He served as chairman, CEO, and president of Burger King and chairman and CEO of DHL Airways. He is currently Chairman and CEO of ASTAR Air Cargo, Inc.

He won the Horatio Alger Award.  In addition, he served on the University of Florida Board of Trustees as well.

References

External links
 2001 USA Today story about the death of six-year-old daughter

1943 births
University of Florida alumni
Living people
American chief financial officers
American chief executives of food industry companies
American airline chief executives
20th-century American businesspeople
Miami Senior High School alumni